Miletich Point (Нос Милетич [ˈnos mi'letitʃ], Nos Miletich) is the rocky point forming the west side of the entrance to Haskovo Cove on Greenwich Island, South Shetland Islands in Antarctica.  Situated 800 m north of the summit of Crutch Peaks, 200 m southeast of Kabile Island, 1.55 km east of Pavlikeni Point, and 2.1 km west of Aprilov Point.

Miletich Point is named for the Bulgarian linguist, ethnographer and historian Lyubomir Miletich (1863–1937).

Location
The point is located at  according to
Bulgarian mapping in 2005 and 2009.

Maps
 L.L. Ivanov et al. Antarctica: Livingston Island and Greenwich Island, South Shetland Islands. Scale 1:100000 topographic map. Sofia: Antarctic Place-names Commission of Bulgaria, 2005.
 L.L. Ivanov. Antarctica: Livingston Island and Greenwich, Robert, Snow and Smith Islands. Scale 1:120000 topographic map.  Troyan: Manfred Wörner Foundation, 2009.

References
Miletich Point. SCAR Composite Gazetteer of Antarctica.
 Bulgarian Antarctic Gazetteer. Antarctic Place-names Commission. (details in Bulgarian, basic data in English)

External links
 Miletich Point. Copernix satellite image

Headlands of Greenwich Island
Bulgaria and the Antarctic